Nicole Narain (born July 28, 1974) is an American model, actress and Playboy Playmate.

Career
She was chosen as Playboy's Playmate of the Month in January 2002 and has appeared in numerous Playboy videos.

She has appeared in multiple music videos like R.L.'s song "Got Me a Model", LL Cool J's "Luv You Better", Mario Winans's "I Don't Wanna Know" and Fabolous' "Baby". Narain also competed on the NBC show Fear Factor Playboy Playmates Edition, but was eliminated in the first stunt.

Personal life
She was born to an Afro-Guyanese mother and a Chindian (mixed Indo-Guyanese and Chinese Guyanese) father. In 2005, Narain was sued by the Irish actor Colin Farrell regarding a sex tape involving Narain and Farrell. This prevented the sale, distribution, or display of the tape. Nevertheless, it still became available on a number of internet sites. The lawsuit was eventually settled amicably.

On November 4, 2009, Narain appeared on The Joy Behar Show to discuss her sex addiction. This appearance was in conjunction with her casting on the reality-based show Sex Rehab with Dr. Drew.

References

External links
 

American film actresses
Actresses from Chicago
2000s Playboy Playmates
1974 births
Living people
Guyanese female models
American female models
American people of Guyanese descent
21st-century American women